Kate Bohner (born April 14, 1967) is an American investment banker, journalist, author, and an active C-Suite executive holding a multitude of senior positions within global financial services firms.  She specializes in Crisis Management and "Tech" Marketing. She was a correspondent for CNBC and associate editor for Forbes magazine. Bohner currently serves as chief communications, research & marketing officer and managing director for DMS Governance.

Early life and education
Bohner was born April 14, 1967, in Wilmington, Delaware.
After studying business and international studies at the University of Pennsylvania, graduating in 1988, Bohner began her career in the mergers and acquisitions department at investment bank Lazard. After she left Lazard, she attended the Columbia University School of Journalism, where she received a Reader's Digest Literary Foundation Fellowship Award, graduating in 1992 with a Master of Science degree in journalism.

Career
At Forbes, Bohner was promoted to writer after 13 months. Her work appeared in the Small Business, Healthcare, Careers, investigative, and other sections of the magazine.  She was then asked to reinvent the column “The Informer”, rising to associate editor. During her time at Forbes, she was an on-air contributor to CNN and to E! Entertainment Network.  She has also written for publications such as Harper’s Bazaar, Marie Claire, and George. She co-authored Donald Trump's 1997 book Trump: The Art of the Comeback. The book hit both the New York Times (#3), the Wall Street Journal (#1) and Businessweek (#2) Bestseller's Lists. That same year she became a correspondent for CNBC, launching “Business Center”, with Maria Bartiromo and Tyler Mathisen. She went on to write and broadcast “Kate Bohner’s Power File” on CNBC’s Power Lunch. In 1998, Jack Reilly, the former executive producer at CNBC, joined her and other NBC veterans in founding a startup internet news service, JAGfn, providing online content similar to that found on CNBC.In 2000, she was recruited as managing editor of digital financial media for E*Trade's start-up financial news effort, a six-day per week webcast from New York City—the show also aired on Sundays on WNEW 102.7 FM. Bohner co-founded medical technology start-up Living Independently, Inc./QuietCare Systems (Care Innovations) in 2001, where she served as chief marketing officer and chief operating officer. In 2006, the company was sold to GE Healthcare and Intel.

Bohner launched “Kate’s Take” on her own YouTube channel KBTVonline in 2006. KBTVonline was a four-minute daily videoblog based and shot in South Florida. The show covered a wide range of information from top news stories to quirky pop culture, finance, politics, healthcare and style. On Christmas Day of 2007, KBTVonline's video hit #1 in 19 countries. Bohner left South Florida for Los Angeles in 2008 and in 2010, she co-founded and became national director of Flybarre, a fitness program part of Flywheel Sports. In 2012, Bohner became chief marketing officer and director of communications at the World Trade Financial Group.

In 2013, Bohner joined DMS Offshore Investment Services Ltd., the world's largest fund governance firm, where she currently serves as chief communications, research & marketing officer and managing director

In July 2015, Bohner appeared on CNN to discuss her experience of working with presidential candidate Donald Trump.

Personal life
Bohner was reported to be in a relationship with Google's executive chairman Eric Schmidt from 2006 to 2010. She was previously married to author Michael Lewis, known for his bestselling books Liar's Poker, The New New Thing, The Blind Side, and Moneyball.

Awards
Bohner was honored for her work in raising awareness about VVF in Nigeria while following Physicians for Peace through video and internet content, receiving the 2008 PFP President's Award for Special Achievement.

References

External links
http://www.bohnerbespoke.com

1967 births
Living people
Wharton School of the University of Pennsylvania alumni
Columbia University Graduate School of Journalism alumni
Writers from Wilmington, Delaware
American women journalists
CNBC people
American business writers
Women business writers
Ghostwriters
21st-century American women